Radio Cooperativa is a radio station in Chile, based in Santiago. It is operated by Compañía Chilena de Comunicaciones S.A.. The station is notable for opposing the Augusto Pinochet dictatorship (1973–1990) and denouncing its human rights violations at a time when reports of said wrongdoings were federally suppressed. The station has historic ties with Chile's Christian Democratic party. It broadcasts on AM frequencies 660 and 1140 or 1150 (kHz), also known as CB-66, CB-114 and CB-115.

External links

Official site
Live broadcast

Radio stations in Chile
Mass media in Santiago